Tshegofatso Nyama (born 20 August 1999) is a South African soccer player who plays as a midfielder for South African Premier Division side TS Galaxy.

References

External links

Living people
1999 births
South African soccer players
Association football midfielders
TS Galaxy F.C. players
South African Premier Division players
National First Division players